Events from the year 1833 in the United States.

Incumbents

Federal Government 
 President: Andrew Jackson (D-Tennessee)
 Vice President: vacant (until March 4), Martin Van Buren (D-New York) (starting March 4)
 Chief Justice: John Marshall (Virginia)
 Speaker of the House of Representatives: Andrew Stevenson (D-Virginia)
 Congress: 22nd (until March 4), 23rd (starting March 4)

Events

January–March
 January 1 – Haverford College, located in Haverford, Pennsylvania, is founded by Quakers of the Society of Friends.
 March 2 – President Andrew Jackson signs the Force Bill, which authorizes him to use troops to enforce Federal law in South Carolina.
 March 4 – Andrew Jackson is sworn in for his second term as President of the United States, and Martin Van Buren is sworn in as Vice President of the United States.
 March 16 – Parley's Magazine, a periodical for young readers, publishes its first issue in Boston.

April–June
 May 11 – French-American farmhand Antoine le Blanc murders family of three.
 June 6 – Andrew Jackson becomes the first U.S. president to ride a railroad train.

July–September
 July 29 – Old State Bank erected in Decatur, Alabama.
 August 12 – The city of Chicago is established at the estuary of the Chicago River by 350 settlers.
 August 20 – Future President of the United States Benjamin Harrison is born in Ohio. From this date until the death of former U.S. President James Madison on June 28, 1836, there are a total of 18 living presidents of the United States (2 former, 1 current, and 15 known future); more than any other time period in U.S. history.
 September 2 – Oberlin College is founded in Oberlin, Ohio by John Shipherd and Philo P. Stewart.

October–December
 November 12–13 – Stars Fell on Alabama: A spectacular occurrence of the Leonid meteor shower is observed in Alabama.
 November 24 – Psi Upsilon is founded at Union College, becoming the fifth fraternity in the United States.
 December
 American Anti-Slavery Society founded in Philadelphia by William Lloyd Garrison and Arthur Tappan.
 Philadelphia Female Anti-Slavery Society is founded; founder members include Sarah Mapps Douglass, Charlotte Forten Grimké and Hetty Reckless.

Ongoing
 Nullification Crisis (1832–1833)

Births
 January 2 – Frederick A. Johnson, politician (died 1893)
 January 18 – Joseph S. Skerrett, admiral (died 1893)
 February 6 – J. E. B. Stuart, United States Army officer; Confederate States Army general in the American Civil War (died 1864)
 February 11 – Melville Fuller, 8th Chief Justice of the Supreme Court (died 1910)
 March 9 – Thomas W. Osborn, U.S. Senator from Florida from 1868 to 1873 (died 1898)
 March 14 – Lucy Hobbs Taylor, dentist (died 1910)
 March 17 – Charles Edwin Wilbour, Egyptologist (died 1896)
 May 24 – John Killefer, businessman and inventor (died 1926)
 May 27 – Hester Martha Poole, writer, poet and art critic (died 1932)
 June 10 – Pauline Cushman, born Harriet Wood, actress and Union spy in the American Civil War (died 1893)
 June 19 – Mary Tenney Gray, editorial writer, club-woman, philanthropist and suffragette (died 1904)
 August 7 – Powell Clayton, U.S. Senator from Arkansas from 1868 to 1871 (died 1914)
 August 12 
 Lillie Devereux Blake, writer and reformer (died 1913)
 Isaac L. Ellwood, businessman, rancher and inventor (died 1910) 
 August 16 – Eliza Ann Otis, poet, newspaper publisher and philanthropist (died 1904) 
 August 20 – Benjamin Harrison, 23rd President of the United States from 1889 to 1893 (died 1901)
 September 21 – James Harvey, U.S. Senator from Kansas from 1833 to 1873 (died 1894)
 October 2 – William Corby, Catholic priest (died 1897)
 October 8 – Edmund Clarence Stedman, poet, critic, essayist, banker and scientist (died 1908)
 November 2 – Horace Howard Furness, Shakespearean scholar (died 1912)
 November 12 – John Martin, U.S. Senator from Kansas from 1893 to 1895 (died 1913)
 November 13 – Edwin Booth, tragic actor (died 1893)
 December 6 – John S. Mosby, Confederate army cavalry battalion commander in the American Civil War (died 1916)
 December 20 – Samuel Mudd, physician implicated in John Wilkes Booth's assassination of Abraham Lincoln in 1865 (died 1883)
 December 29 – John James Ingalls, U.S. Senator from Kansas from 1873 to 1891 (died 1900)

Deaths
 January 17 – William Rush, sculptor (born 1756)
 May 19 – Josiah S. Johnston, U.S. Senator from Louisiana from 1824 to 1833 (born 1784)
 May 23 – Francesca Anna Canfield, poet and translator (born 1803)
 May 24 – John Randolph, planter and congressman, U.S. senator from Virginia from 1825 to 1827 (born 1773)
 June 1 – Oliver Wolcott Jr., 2nd U.S. Secretary of the Treasury (born 1760)
 July 12 – Samuel Sterett, politician (born 1758)
 July 20 – Ninian Edwards, politician, governor of and senator from Illinois (born 1775)
 July 27 – William Bainbridge, United States Navy officer (born 1774)
 September 28 – Lemuel Haynes, clergyman and veteran of the American Revolution (born 1753)

See also
Timeline of United States history (1820–1859)

References

External links
 

 
1830s in the United States
United States
United States
Years of the 19th century in the United States